Sea Ranch is an unincorporated community in Sonoma County, California, United States that was developed as planned community beginning in the 1960s. It is known for its distinctive timber-frame structures designed by several noted American architects. The first unit built at Sea Ranch, Condominium 1, was placed on the National Register of Historic Places in 2005. The community's development played a role in the establishment of the California Coastal Commission. The population was 1,305 at the 2010 census. For statistical purposes, the United States Census Bureau has defined Sea Ranch as a census-designated place (CDP).

History
The first people known to live in the area were Pomos, who gathered kelp and shellfish from the beaches.

In 1846, Ernest Rufus received the Rancho German Mexican land grant, which extended along the coastline from the Gualala River to Ocean Cove. The land was later divided. In the early 1900s, Walter P. Frick bought up the pieces to create Del Mar Ranch, which was leased out for raising sheep. In 1941, the land was sold to Margaret Ohlson and her family.

Architect and planner Al Boeke envisioned a community that would preserve the area's natural beauty. Boeke first surveyed the land in 1962. In 1963, Oceanic California Inc., a division of Castle and Cooke Inc., purchased the land from the Ohlsons and assembled a design team. A progressive residential community was envisioned that would be built in a way that was not only in tune with nature, but driven by nature. Principal designers who were recruited by Boeke included American architects Charles Moore, Joseph Esherick, William Turnbull Jr., Donlyn Lyndon, Richard Whitaker and landscape architect Lawrence Halprin. Halprin created the master plan for Sea Ranch, which encompass  of the Sonoma County coastline. The principal photographer for the project was the architectural photographer Morley Baer, a friend and colleague of both Turnbull and Halprin. Marion Conrad was hired to manage the public relations for The Sea Ranch. The logo for The Sea Ranch was designed by Barbara Stauffacher Solomon along with the Supergraphics.

Beach access dedication 
While the County Board of Supervisors initially regarded the developer's offer to dedicate  for public parkland as sufficient, opponents felt more coastal access was necessary. The site, containing 10 miles (16 km) of shore, had been available to the public but would be reserved for private use under the developer's plan. Areas below high tide were and would remain public property, but the plan provided no access through the development. In addition, California's coast at the time was only open to the public along 100 of its .

Californians Organized to Acquire Access to State Tidelands (COAST) was formed in response to this issue, and their 1968 county ballot initiative attempted to require the development to include public trails to the tidelands. While the initiative did not pass, the California legislature's Dunlap Act did pass that year and required that new coastal development dedicate trails granting public access to the ocean.  This episode led to the establishment of the Coastal Alliance, an organization of 100 groups similar to COAST, that placed Proposition 20 on the statewide 1972 ballot. The initiative passed, and it established the California Coastal Commission, which continues to regulate land use on the California coast.

Geography
The Sea Ranch is reached by way of State Route 1.

Climate
According to the Köppen Climate Classification system, Sea Ranch has a warm-summer Mediterranean climate, abbreviated "Csb" on climate maps.

Demographics
For statistical purposes, the United States Census Bureau has defined Sea Ranch as a census-designated place (CDP). The census definition of the area may not precisely correspond to the local understanding of the community.

2010
The 2010 United States Census reported that The Sea Ranch had a population of 1,305. The racial makeup of The Sea Ranch was 1,220 (93.5%) White, 15 (1.1%) African American, 3 (0.2%) Native American, 10 (0.8%) Asian, 0 (0.0%) Pacific Islander, 37 (2.8%) from other races, and 20 (1.5%) from two or more races. Hispanic or Latino of any race were 117 persons (9.0%).

The Census reported that 100% of the population lived in households.

There were 689 households, out of which 58 (8.4%) had children under the age of 18 living in them, 407 (59.1%) were opposite-sex married couples living together, 19 (2.8%) had a female householder with no husband present, 9 (1.3%) had a male householder with no wife present.  There were 27 (3.9%) unmarried opposite-sex partnerships, and 21 (3.0%) same-sex married couples or partnerships. 197 households (28.6%) were made up of individuals, and 113 (16.4%) had someone living alone who was 65 years of age or older. The average household size was 1.89.  There were 435 families (63.1% of all households); the average family size was 2.25.

The population was spread out, with 105 people (8.0%) under the age of 18, 18 people (1.4%) aged 18 to 24, 92 people (7.0%) aged 25 to 44, 495 people (37.9%) aged 45 to 64, and 595 people (45.6%) who were 65 years of age or older.  The median age was 63.7 years. For every 100 females, there were 91.6 males.  For every 100 females age 18 and over, there were 90.2 males.

The homeowner vacancy rate was 3.4%; the rental vacancy rate was 38.8%. 81.5% of the population lived in owner-occupied housing units and 18.5% lived in rental housing units.

2000
In 2000, of the residents in the census tabulation, 365 (48.6%) were male and 386 (51.4%) were female. The median age was 61.3 years. Nine residents (1.2%) were aged under five years, 713 residents (94.9%) were aged 18 years or more, and 287 (12.4%) were aged 65 years or more. The census categorized 732 (97.5%) as white, 8 (1.1%) as black or African American, 2 (0.3%) as Asian, and 9 (1.2%) as two or more races. The census counted 13 residents as Hispanic or Latino. The average household size was 1.88, and the average family size was 2.17. The census counted 1,211 housing units, 365 of them owner-occupied, 35 renter-occupied, and 811 (67%) vacant. The median reported household income was $69,327, and the median per capita income was $21,587. There were 25 people (3.3%) living below the poverty line.

Design

The Sea Ranch has distinctive architecture consisting of simple timber-frame structures clad in wooden siding or shingles. The building typology of the Sea Ranch draws on the local agricultural buildings for inspiration, in the way that those buildings are designed to deal with prevailing weather and topography. Originally, the Sea Ranch had local lumber mills to draw on for the Douglas Fir and Redwood used in the homes. The majority of the 1800 or so homes are smaller second homes, though there are about 300 full-time residents. Approximately half the homes are rented as weekend rentals. The eventual build-out is expected to comprise approximately 2400 homes; the number varies as some current owners purchase adjacent vacant lots and merge the two, to preserve open space. The buildings could be considered a hybrid of modern and vernacular architecture, also known as the "Third Bay Tradition," and also referred to as "Sea Ranch" style.

The original design guidelines suggest that buildings have a site specific relationship with the landscape. The Sea Ranch design review requirements specify that the buildings become part of the landscape, not subordinate to it, but do not dominate either. Details such as exteriors of unpainted wood or muted stains, a lack of overhanging eaves, and baffles on exterior lighting subdue the appearance of the buildings in the landscape. The baffles minimize nighttime light pollution; there are no street lights to obscure the night sky. The lack of roof overhangs is also intended to allow the near-constant strong breezes to pass over the buildings without the turbulence the overhangs would create. The Sea Ranch design review process does not affect  the building interiors, but all construction is subject to Sonoma County Permit and Resource Management oversight.

Landscaping in The Sea Ranch is regulated by a design manual which prohibits perimeter fences and limits non-indigenous plants to screened courtyards. A herd of sheep is used to keep grass low to the ground to reduce the threat of fire during the summer months.

Architects 

Over the decades many architects have designed houses at Sea Ranch, including:
 Al Boeke
 J. Carson Bowler
 Obie Bowman
 Steve Brodie
 William Scott Ellsworth
 Joseph Esherick
 Nicholas Forell
 John Halley
 Paul Lucas Hamilton
 Robert Hartstock
 George W. Homsey
 Donald Jacobs
 Daniel Levin
 Donlyn Lyndon
 Louis McLane
 Charles Moore
 Fiona O'Neill
 Lisa Scott
 Ted Smith
 William Turnbull Jr.
 Dimitri Vedensky
 Ned Westover
 Richard Whitaker

Landscape architects 

Lawrence Halprin

Points of interest

 

Condominium One (completed in 1965) was awarded the American Institute of Architects Twenty-five Year Award in 1991, and was added to The National Register of Historic Places in 2005.

The Sonoma County Regional Parks Department provides coastal access from six places along State Route 1 in The Sea Ranch area:
 Black Point (trail) at 35035 State Route 1
 Gualala Point Regional Park at 42401 State Route 1
 Pebble Beach (trail) at 36448 State Route 1
 Shell Beach (trail) at 39200 State Route 1
 Stengel Beach (trail) at 37900 State Route 1
 Walk On Beach (trail) at 40101 State Route 1

References

External links 

The Sea Ranch Association
History of the Sea Ranch Area
 Aerial Photographs
Journey to the Sea Ranch

Populated coastal places in California
Census-designated places in Sonoma County, California
Unincorporated communities in California
Tourist attractions in the San Francisco Bay Area
Census-designated places in California
Unincorporated communities in Sonoma County, California